Pezzana (Piedmontese: Psan-a) is a comune (municipality) of about 1,000 inhabitants in the Province of Vercelli in the Italian region Piedmont, located about  northeast of Turin and about  southeast of Vercelli.

Pezzana borders the following municipalities: Asigliano Vercellese, Caresana, Palestro, Prarolo, Rosasco, and Stroppiana.

Demographic evolution

References